Zafra pumila is a species of sea snail in the family Columbellidae, the dove snails.

Description
The shell size varies between 3 mm and 5 mm.

Distribution
This species occurs in the Red Sea and in the Indian Ocean off Madagascar, Northern KwaZuluNatal, RSA, Réunion and in the Western Pacific Ocean,  New Caledonia, Queensland, and New South Wales

References

 Dautzenberg, Ph. (1929). . Faune des Colonies Francaises, Tome III
 

pumila
Gastropods described in 1858